The Chodakowski family (Lithuanian: Chodakauskas) is a Lithuanian noble family. They originated in the Grand Duchy of Lithuania and increased in notability under the Polish-Lithuanian Commonwealth and the First Republic of Lithuania. They use the Dołęga Coat of Arms.

History 
The family may have originated in Chodakow, a town in south central Poland.

The Chodakowski family can trace their ancestry back to Mikołaj Chodakowski (born c1510) who was granted Lichosielce Manor with a land property by Privilege on September 4, 1532, by Sigismund I the Old, the Grand Duke of Lithuania and King of Poland.

In the Lietuvos Metrikos, the Court Case Book of Lithuania, Mikołaj is mentioned as Vaŭkavysk's deputy mayor and local lord. He participated in the examination of some cases with other representatives of the court.

For the following five generations (1532-1807) the family remained in the Vaŭkavysk area of present-day Belarus.

On July 19, 1565, Jan Chodakowski, son of Mikołaj Chodakowski, the clerk of the Vaŭkavysk's County Land Court of the Grand Duchy of Lithuania in 1565,  sent two horsemen to the Lithuanian army and an additional one for Sigismund II Augustus.

In 1792 Jakub Chodakowski took part in the Battle of Mir in the war between the Polish-Lithuanian Commonwealth and Russia. After the 3rd Partition of the Polish-Lithuanian Commonwealth, he was appointed a judge of Grodno-Vaŭkavysk.

It was not until 1807, when Antoni Chodakowski (1784-1831) joined the Polish Lancers in Napoleon's Imperial Guard, that the family would eventually find itself in Vilnius and later in northern Lithuania.

The family was confirmed as nobility on:

 September 29, 1817 (Grodno Province)
 January 28, 1828 (Grodno Province)
 October 6, 1832 (Grodno Province)
 March 13, 1834 (Grodno Province)
 July 26, 1840
 July 5, 1844
 October 30, 1844
 1882 (District of Panevėžys)

The Chodakowski family were instrumental in the creation and running of the First Republic of Lithuania.

The family remained in the area of present-day Lithuania until World War II when many fled West, to settle in the USA and Canada. Some branches of the family remained in Lithuania during the Communist occupation.

The family are now predominantly in Lithuania, Canada and the United States.

One of the branches of the family once owned Bobolice Castle near Krakow, Poland.

Notable members 

 Antoni Chodakowski (1784-1831) Lieutenant in the 1st Regiment of the Polish Lancers of the Imperial Guard of Napoleon Bonaparte; 
 Romanas Chodakauskas (1883-1932) Colonel in the Lithuanian military court and military attaché to Berlin; 
 Sofija Chodakauskaitė (1884-1968) First Lady of Lithuania, wife of the first President of Lithuania, Antanas Smetona (1874-1944);
Tadas Chodakauskas (1889-1959) the long-standing mayor of Panevėžys, Lithuania (1925-1940);
 Jadvyga Chodakauskaitė (1891-1988) journalist, activist, Deputy Chief of Mission to Switzerland and the wife of Lithuanian Prime Minister Juozas Tūbelis (1882-1939).

References

Lithuanian noble families
Polish noble families